The A10 motorway is a motorway in the Netherlands. This motorway is the ring road around the city of Amsterdam. Five other motorways connect to the A10: motorway A8 at interchange Coenplein (north), motorway A5 at interchange Coenplein (south), A4 at interchange De Nieuwe Meer, A2 at interchange Amstel, and A1 at interchange Watergraafsmeer. Part of the A10 is the Coentunnel, crossing the Noordzeekanaal ("North Sea Canal"). This twin tube tunnel was notorious for traffic jams for decades and another two tubes have been built. These new tubes opened on 13 May 2013 and the old tubes were closed for extensive renovation. On 21 July 2014 the old tubes were reopened after completing the renovations and all four tubes became be available for traffic.

The city of Amsterdam has a network of numbered stadsroutes (city routes). These routes are indicated with an "s" prefix followed by a three digit number starting at 100. Since these s-routes are connected to the A10 motorway and each s-route only crosses the motorway once, these numbers can be considered as the first exit numbers on Dutch motorways. Recently, regular exit numbering has been implemented based on the numbers of the s-routes. For example, the junction leading towards the s106 used to be exit number s106 and is now numbered as exit 6.

History
Construction started in 1962, and the first part was completed four years later. The Coentunnel was opened on 21 June 1966. The western part of the A10 (the Einsteinweg) was finished on 2 April 1975 and the southern part on 7 July 1981. The eastern and northern part were finished in 1990, with the completion of another tunnel under the IJ, the Zeeburgertunnel.

Speed limit 
The western part of the A10, between interchange De Nieuwe Meer and exit 2 has a speed limit of 80 km/h (50 mph). The rest of the A10 is 100 km/h (62 mph). During rush hour the speed on the southern part can be reduced to 80 km/h if the hard shoulder is opened for use as an additional traffic lane.

Exit list

External links

References 

Ring roads
Transport infrastructure completed in 1966
Motorways in the Netherlands
Motorways in North Holland
Transport in Amsterdam